Álvaro Juan Cruz Armada (born 28 July 1992) is a Spanish footballer who plays for CA Osasuna as a left back.

Club career
Born in Madrid, Cruz was an Atlético Madrid youth graduate before joining Italian Serie A side Bologna F.C. 1909 on 30 August 2010. After spending two full seasons with the Primavera side, he was loaned to Carrarese Calcio on 26 July 2012.

On 10 July 2013 Cruz joined San Marino Calcio. In 2015, after two years as a starter, he moved to fellow Lega Pro side U.S. Pistoiese 1921.

On 19 August 2016, Cruz returned to Spain after agreeing to a contract with Segunda División B side UD San Sebastián de los Reyes. The following 22 July he moved to fellow league team CF Rayo Majadahonda, being a regular starter as his side achieved promotion to Segunda División for the first time ever.

On 10 July 2018, free agent Cruz signed for Elche CF in the second division. He immediately became a starter for the side, contributing with one goal and 39 appearances (play-offs included) during the 2019–20 season, as his side achieved promotion to La Liga.

On 30 August 2020, Cruz joined top tier side CA Osasuna on a three-year contract, for a fee of €2.75 million.

Career statistics

Club

References

External links

1992 births
Living people
Spanish footballers
Footballers from Madrid
Association football defenders
La Liga players
Segunda División players
Segunda División B players
UD San Sebastián de los Reyes players
CF Rayo Majadahonda players
Elche CF players
CA Osasuna players
Serie C players
Bologna F.C. 1909 players
Carrarese Calcio players
A.S.D. Victor San Marino players
U.S. Pistoiese 1921 players
Spanish expatriate footballers
Spanish expatriate sportspeople in Italy
Expatriate footballers in Italy